Miguel González (born 17 January 1969) is a Paraguayan boxer. He competed in the men's light welterweight event at the 1988 Summer Olympics. At the 1988 Summer Olympics, he lost to Grahame Cheney of Australia.

References

1969 births
Living people
Light-welterweight boxers
Paraguayan male boxers
Olympic boxers of Paraguay
Boxers at the 1988 Summer Olympics
Pan American Games competitors for Paraguay
Boxers at the 1987 Pan American Games
Place of birth missing (living people)
20th-century Paraguayan people